Son Sardina is a station on the Palma Metro. It is located in the northerly neighborhood of Son Sardina in Palma on the island of Majorca, Spain.

The above ground open-air station lies parallel to Highway Ma-11 and also serves the adjacent Ferrocarril de Sóller line going to the town of Sóller.

The metro station was opened 25 April 2007 and includes an adjacent free car park.

References

Palma Metro stations
Railway stations in Spain opened in 2007